is a Japanese former professional baseball outfielder in Japan's Nippon Professional Baseball. He played for the Fukuoka SoftBank Hawks from 2005 to 2018.

External links

NPB stats

1985 births
Fukuoka Daiei Hawks players
Fukuoka SoftBank Hawks players
Japanese baseball players
Living people
Nippon Professional Baseball outfielders
People from Ichinomiya, Aichi
Baseball people from Aichi Prefecture
Japanese baseball coaches
Nippon Professional Baseball coaches